Ulu (Uluu) is a rural locality (a selo) under the administrative jurisdiction of the Town of Tommot in Aldansky District of the Sakha Republic, Russia, located on the left bank of the Ulu River, a tributary of the Amga, and  from Tommot. Its population as of the 2010 Census was 139; down from 179 recorded in the 2002 Census.

Etymology
The name derives from a Sakha word meaning "great".

History
It was founded in 1953 as a base for construction of the Lena Highway.

Infrastructure
Besides the highway to the republic capital city of Yakutsk, Ulu has a railway station on the Amur–Yakutsk Mainline, with the railhead having reached Ulu in August 2009.

References

Notes

Sources
Official website of the Sakha Republic. Registry of the Administrative-Territorial Divisions of the Sakha Republic. Aldansky District. 

Rural localities in Aldansky District